Quezon City, the most populous city in the Philippines, is politically subdivided into 142 barangays. All of Quezon City's barangays are classified as urban.

These barangays are grouped into six congressional districts, with each district represented by a congressman in the House of Representatives. As of July 2, 2012, President Benigno S. Aquino III signed into law Republic Act No. 10170, dividing and reapportioning the Second District into three legislative districts, namely the Second, Fifth and Sixth Districts.

Barangays by district

District 1

District 2

District 3

District 4

District 5

District 6

See also
 List of populated places in Manila

References

External links
Philippine Standard Geographic Code

Quezon City
 
Quezon City
Quezon City